The 2015 Rally de Portugal was the fifth round of the 2015 World Rally Championship season. For the first time since 2001, the Rally de Portugal returned to the north of Portugal, returning to the stage sections that earned the rally the world's best award 6 times, and large crowds lined the stages.

Jari-Matti Latvala won the Rally de Portugal for the first time, taking his first victory of the 2015 season.

Entry list

Report
The race began with the return of the mythical super special stage at Lousada rallycross track, with 15,000 spectators attending. As in the shakedown, Andreas Mikkelsen was the fastest, followed by Sébastien Ogier and Jari-Matti Latvala. Robert Kubica took the all-new Ford Fiesta RS WRC – as premiered by M-Sport – to 4th place.

On the second day of the event, the rally moved to the Minho Province, with the section of Caminha proving to be quite hard, causing several dropouts and mechanical breakdowns. Ogier, as championship leader, was first into the stages and suffered a flat tyre on the second stage and finished the day in 2nd overall. At the end of the fifth stage, Latvala was the leader by 11.1 seconds ahead of Kris Meeke, with Mikkelsen 16 seconds down in third. Dani Sordo, winner of the first stage of the day, was only 5th.

On Saturday, Ogier regained some time, winning all three afternoon stages and finished the day in 2nd place, 9.5 seconds behind the leader, Latvala. Meeke won two of the stages and was 3rd, 20 seconds behind Latvala. Mikkelsen – the day's other stage winner – was fourth, trailing Meeke by 1.1 seconds. Elfyn Evans retired after the day's first stage with electrical problems in his Ford Fiesta RS WRC, while Tanak and Sordo – already at more than a minute behind the lead – were out of the fight for a podium finish. Neuville overturned and Ostberg suffered engine problems in his Citroën.

On Sunday, three stages remained; two runs of the Fafe stage – the second being the power stage – with one pass through the Vieira do Minho. On the first pass of Fafe, and the benefit of a better road position, Ogier gained 1.7 seconds on Latvala. Latvala recovered the time loss and increased the advantage to 10.4 seconds, while Mikkelsen moved ahead of Meeke into a podium position. In the decisive power-stage, Ogier recovered 2.2 seconds on Latvala, and as a result, Latvala won the event by 8.2 seconds.

Results

Event standings (top-10)

Special stages

Power Stage
The "Power stage" was a  stage at the end of the rally.

References

Portugal
Rally de Portugal
Rally